Rhinomyza is a genus of horse flies in the family Tabanidae.

Species
Rhinomyza atricincta(Schuurmans Stekhoven, 1928)	
Rhinomyza cincta Philip, 1960
Rhinomyza fusca Wiedemann, 1820
Rhinomyza oculata Philip & Mackerras, 1960

References

Taxa named by Christian Rudolph Wilhelm Wiedemann
Diptera of Asia
Brachycera genera
Tabanidae